The acentric factor  is a conceptual number introduced by Kenneth Pitzer in 1955, proven to be useful in the description of fluids. It has become a standard for the phase characterization of single & pure components, along with other state description parameters such as molecular weight, critical temperature, critical pressure, and critical volume (or critical compressibility). 

Pitzer defined  from the relationship

where
 is the reduced saturation vapor pressure and 
 is the reduced temperature.

The acentric factor is said to be a measure of the non-sphericity (centricity) of molecules. As it increases, the vapor curve is "pulled" down, resulting in higher boiling points. For many monatomic fluids, 
In many cases,  lies above the boiling temperature of liquids at atmosphere pressure.

Values of  can be determined for any fluid from accurate experimental vapor pressure data. The definition of  gives values which are close to zero for the noble gases argon, krypton, and xenon.  is also very close to zero for molecules which are nearly spherical.  Values of  correspond to vapor pressures above the critical pressure, and are non-physical.

The acentric factor can be predicted analytically from some equations of state. For example, it can be easily shown from the above definition that a van der Waals fluid has an acentric factor of about −0.302024, which if applied to a real system would indicate a small, ultra-spherical molecule.

Values of some common gases

See also

 Equation of state
 Reduced pressure
 Reduced temperature

References 

Gas laws